Aplastodiscus lutzorum is a species of frogs in the family Hylidae. It is endemic to the Cerrado region in Brazil and is known from the Federal District and the adjacent eastern Goiás and northwestern Minas Gerais states. The specific name lutzorum honors Adolfo and Bertha Lutz, Brazilian zoologists.

Description
The snout is nearly rounded. The tympanum is distinct, as is the supratympanic fold. The fingers and the toes are long and bear terminal discs; webbing is reduced and no lateral fringes are present. Skin of the head and the dorsum is smooth but granular elsewhere. The upper surfaces are yellowish green with small and scattered melanophores, turning dark green in the head. The eye is surrounded by a black ring. The iris is golden in its upper third and red copper below. The underparts are uniformly pale yellow. Males have a single, subgular vocal sac that is bluish green.

Habitat and conservation
As of late 2018, the species had not been included in the IUCN Red List of Threatened Species, but Berneck and colleagues suggest it should be considered of "least concern", because most of the know occurrences are inside protected areas, including the Chapada dos Veadeiros National Park.

References 

lutzorum
Amphibians of Brazil
Endemic fauna of Brazil
Amphibians described in 2017